MWp or MWP may refer to:

 Medieval Warm Period, a time of warm climate in the North Atlantic region
 Mega Watt peak, a solar power measure in photo-voltaic (PV) industry to describe a unit's nominal power
 Member of the Welsh Parliament, alternative term to Member of the Senedd (MS) 
 Modern Whig Party, see 
 Mwp (moment magnitude WP), a seismic scale